Javier Gómez Darmendrail (Madrid, Spain 7 March 1949) is a Spanish politician who belongs to the People's Party (PP).

Married with three children, Gómez graduated in French philology and later worked as a teacher.

Gómez began his political career in 1989 when he was elected to the Spanish Congress of Deputies representing Segovia Province and has been re-elected at each subsequent general election.

In Congress, he has been a member of the sub-committees on Defence, Education and Culture, Industry, Energy and Tourism and Infrastructure. After serving in the Executive Committee of the PP in Segovia Province, he was selected as a member of the national executive of the PP in October 2007 In the past Gómez has also served as a member of the Parliamentary Assembly of NATO.

References

Members of the 4th Congress of Deputies (Spain)
Members of the 5th Congress of Deputies (Spain)
Members of the 6th Congress of Deputies (Spain)
Members of the 7th Congress of Deputies (Spain)
Members of the 8th Congress of Deputies (Spain)
Members of the 9th Congress of Deputies (Spain)
1949 births
People's Party (Spain) politicians
People from Madrid
Living people